Hannes Heide (born 17 October 1966) is an Austrian politician who was elected as a Member of the European Parliament in 2019.

Political career
In parliament, Heide has been serving on the Committee on Culture and Education since 2019. In 2022, he joined the Committee of Inquiry to investigate the use of Pegasus and equivalent surveillance spyware.  

In addition to his committee assignments, Heide has been part of the Parliament's delegation to the ACP–EU Joint Parliamentary Assembly.  He is also a member of the URBAN Intergroup and the European Parliament Intergroup on Western Sahara.

References

Living people
1966 births
MEPs for Austria 2019–2024
Social Democratic Party of Austria MEPs
Social Democratic Party of Austria politicians